The Fort Wayne Children's Zoo is a zoo in Fort Wayne, Indiana, United States. The Fort Wayne Children’s Zoo is operated by the non-profit Fort Wayne Zoological Society under a cooperative agreement with the Fort Wayne Parks and Recreation Department. The zoo receives no tax funding for operations and operates solely on earned revenue and donations.

The zoo continuously ranks among the top zoos in the U.S. In 2015, TripAdvisor named it the seventh best zoo in the nation.

History 
The FWCZ can trace its origins to 1952 when  were added to Franke Park in Fort Wayne, Indiana, to establish a nature preserve. Local popularity of the preserve led to Fort Wayne officials deciding to build a full-fledged zoo by 1962. The zoo's mission was to educate children about animals.

Earl Wells was the original Zoo Director. In 1976, a major expansion of the zoo was the African Veldt attraction, where savanna animals grazed in open fields east of the Central Zoo. In 1987, the Australian Adventure premiered, showcasing animals from the Outback. A domed Indonesian Rain Forest exhibit opened in 1994, with Orangutan Valley opening a year later, and Tiger Forest in 1996.

On May 18, 2004, 7.5-year-old "Coolah", the last remaining Tasmanian devil to live outside of Australia, died from complications of inoperable cancer. Coolah had drawn international attention to the zoo once Australia banned the export of Tasmanian devils after the species became endangered. Over the years, the zoo was home to 12 Tasmanian devils, the most of any zoo in the U.S.

On July 1, 2015, the zoo celebrated its 50th anniversary with about 400 guests. The 47th Three Rivers Festival parade honored the occasion, with the theme "Here's to Zoo".

On March 3, 2020, the zoo announced that longtime Executive Director Jim Anderson would retire at the end of the 2020 season. Anderson has served as the Zoo’s executive director since 1994, when he succeeded its founding executive director, Earl Wells. On September 1, 2020, The Board of Directors announced Rick Schuiteman from the San Diego Zoo would replace Anderson as only the third Executive Director.

News
On October 19, 2004, five wildebeests broke through a gate and jumped a fence, roaming the streets of a nearby neighborhood. Eventually, the wildebeests were captured, though two of them suffered broken legs and were forced to be euthanized. The zoo was fined $825 for the incident.

On November 2, 2007, artificial rocks made of Styrofoam caught fire in the zoo's new African Journey expansion, the largest project in the zoo's 42-year history. The fire happened where workers were constructing an African lion exhibit, the centerpiece of the new expansion. Thick black plumes of smoke billowing from the site of the fire were clearly visible across the skies of Fort Wayne and much of the region. No workers or animals were harmed in the blaze.

On February 4, 2021, the zoo announced two of its Sumatran tigers tested positive for COVID-19.   Both cats were showing mild signs of a dry cough, triggering animal care experts to take notice.  Fecal samples for both tigers, Bugara and Indah, were collected for testing and performed in veterinary laboratories. The tigers recovered without incident.

On March 15, 2022, the zoo announced their support of Ukrainian Zoos, during the Russian War, by contributing $5,000 from their Conservation Fund to go directly to the EAZA to support Zoo animals and keeper staff. 

The Fort Wayne Children's Zoo announced it would reopen in December, a month after they closed for the season, for a special holiday version of the zoo called Wild Zoo Wonderland (a play on their Wild Zoo Halloween event in October) that includes opening the central zoo, the Reef, Sting Ray Bay, and train.  Santa Claus will be at the Zoo, along with special activities and decor.  This is the first time the Zoo has participated in a holiday event since the mid-nineties.

Exhibits
The zoo consists of four self-contained biomes themed as different regions of the world.

African Journey 

The African Journey opened to the public June 6, 2009, on the former site of the African Veldt. The $9 million African Journey is currently the largest expansion in the FWCZ's history, featuring an African lion exhibit, African Village, interactive cultural center, giraffe feeding area, Safari Trail, zebras and white-bearded gnus, new animal exhibits: (mongooses, buzzards, the dik-dik and hyenas, the honey badger, the bat-eared fox, pelicans, and servals), Amur leopards and a group educational and picnic area. The Sky Safari, a ski lift-like ride, gives riders an aerial view of the Serengeti-based landscape.

One of the zoo's most famous animals, Bill the lion, was euthanized on April 6, 2016, due to an aggressive cancer. Zoo officials spotted the cancer only seven days before Bill had to be euthanized.

Australian Adventure 
The Australian Adventure houses the majority of the Zoo's Australian animals.

The former Australian Adventure area opened with Australia After Dark exhibit, featuring nocturnal animals native to Australia such as bats, echidnas, and owls. A separate building held a 20,000-gallon aquarium containing the Sharks, Rays, and Jellyfish Exhibit, as well as a model coral reef with tropical fish. In the Kangaroo Walkabout, a roped path lead through an open area of kangaroos, which may cross the path at their leisure. The dingo exhibit held a mating pair and produced and housed a new litter of dingo pups in 2012. An aviary featured birds native to Australia. There were other assorted exhibits, and a Dugout Canoe Ride where you could view the Australian Adventure from a canal.

The new Australian Adventure is roughly the same, except a Stingray exhibit replacing Australia After Dark and a new Aquarium (both accessed by a new plaza), and several other new buildings, including a new exhibit for Tasmanian devils.    The Stingray Exhibit also offers daily feeding where guests can feed them for a nominal charge.

Central Zoo 
The Central Zoo includes assorted animals from the Americas and a few from other regions, including Canada lynx, ring-tailed lemurs, African penguins, otters, tortoises, alligators and macaws. Sea Lion Beach is a major attraction full of California sea lions. Sea Lion Beach has a scheduled feeding performances occur periodically throughout the day. Monkey Island contains a family of Panamanian white-faced capuchins. Peacocks roam freely throughout the farm. Also located in the Central Zoo is a duck pond.

The recently added Indiana Family Farm expands from the old petting zoo area, which contained only goats, wild turkeys, ravens, chickens, and white-tailed deer. Now a model barn and farmhouse, as well as signs from the point of view of children living on a farm, lend atmosphere. Horses, sheep, rabbits, calves, and others are all contained in open stalls and may be petted by visitors. Barn mice and other small animals can be viewed. Goats reside in an open paddock which visitors can enter, and, for a price, feed the goats pellets from ice cream cones and milk from bottles, or brush them for free. This area is considered part of the Central Zoo and is located directly before the exit. The Wild Things Gift Shop at the exit was recently expanded.

Indonesian Rain Forest 
The Indonesian Rain Forest features orangutans, Sumatran tigers, Komodo dragons, reticulated pythons, clouded leopards, assorted birds, mammals, and primates, as well as a domed area (Domeaviary) containing birds, fish, reptiles, and, until recently, butterflies. The domeaviary allows visitors to experience the sights, sounds, and feel of a rain forest, along with  a skeletal display of an endangered Sumatran elephant and a skull of a Sumatran rhinoceros.  This area also has an Endangered Species Carousel.

Treetop Trail 
The Treetop Trail is a boardwalk pathway where visitors can view and observe rare animals, such as the prevost's squirrel, wrinkled hornbill, Javan gibbon and white-crested laughing thrush.

Animal Births 

Early in the morning of Saturday, November 22, 2014, Tara, a 19-year-old Sumatran orangutan, whose pregnancy was announced in October 2014 (orangutans are critically endangered), gave birth to a healthy female baby. The baby's father is a 28-year-old male named Tengku. Tengku arrived in Fort Wayne in 1995, from Zoo Atlanta, and Tara arrived in 2013 from the Columbus Zoo; orangutan gestation is normally 245 days. Though Tara had never given birth before and had never observed other females of her species caring for their offspring, Fort Wayne officials, having observed her after the birth, are cautiously optimistic, having prepared for these potential obstacles when, after agreeing to try and breed them on the recommendation of the Association of Zoos and Aquariums' Orangutan Species Survival Plan program, they formulated a detailed Birth Management Plan.

The baby orangutan, named Asmara, who was born on November 22, 2014, has made Orangutan Valley a popular destination in the zoo, as guests can frequently spot her and her mother Tara in the enclosure. The other adult male orangutan in this facility is named Owen who is a hybrid orangutan and not under any breeding recommendations, thus he is spayed. He also serves a role as a father figure to Asmara.

Education programs

The Fort Wayne Children's Zoo has educational programs for all ages.   Programs include in-zoo programs and in-class visits by Zoo Educators and animals.  The Zoo also has a busy summer season, hosting almost 2,000 children from K–12 in summer camps.   The Teens for Nature program, for 7th–12th graders, helps teens focus on nature, animals, conservation, and leadership.  Over 300 teens volunteer to be a part of the program.

Rides
The Fort Wayne Children's Zoo offers several child-friendly rides.  Guests can purchase tokens to ride the rides:

 Endangered Species Carousel, located in the Indonesian Rain Forest
 The Sky Safari, a ski lift-like ride, gives riders an aerial view of the Serengeti-based landscape and is located in the African Journey area of the Zoo.
 The Central Zoo offers rides on a miniature train.
 In the Australian Adventure Area, guests can ride the Log Ride and can view the Australian Adventure from a canal.

References

External links 

Visit Fort Wayne

1965 establishments in Indiana
Culture of Fort Wayne, Indiana
Tourist attractions in Fort Wayne, Indiana
Zoos in Indiana